Big Run is a river of 13 miles in length, located one-and-a-half miles west of Spruce Knob in Monongahela National Forest, in Pendleton County, West Virginia. It is a tributary of the North Fork South Branch Potomac River.

Description

The river begins as a series of gullies through an open marshland just south of the northernmost bend in Forest Road 112. Between river mile (RM) 12.8 and 12.4, a series of beaver dams causes the valley to transition from wetland into a string of lakes. From the last beaver dam at RM 12.4, a recognizable river emerges. The open field ends and the river enters a forested ravine.

Big Run joins with tributaries Elk Run at RM 5, Teeter Camp Run at RM 3.6 and Sawmill Branch Run at RM 3.2.

The river empties into the North Fork South Branch Potomac River just outside of Cherry Grove, along Snowy Mountain Road just across the bridge over the Potomac.

This is one of a number of Potomac tributaries known as Big Run, including Big Run at Romney and Big Run at Harper.

Trail access

Big Run Trail (Forest Trail 527) runs along the east bank of upper length of Big Run. A portion of the trail is the remnant of the rail line that served Parsons Pulp and Lumber Company at Horton near Gandy Creek. The trail can be accessed from either Gatewood Trail off of Sawmill Run Road / Forest Road 28/10 at RM 10.9 or the parking lot at the northernmost oxbow of Forest Road 112.

References

Bibliography

External links
 Forrest Service, Big Run Trail - Forest Trail 527
 Allegheny-Big Run Trailhead - Seneca Creek Backcountry - Monongahela National Forest - Circleville, West Virginia

Rivers of Pendleton County, West Virginia
Rivers of West Virginia
Tributaries of the Potomac River
Monongahela National Forest